Baggaley may refer to:
Baggaley, Pennsylvania
5136 Baggaley, an asteroid

People with the name Baggaley
Andrew Baggaley, an English table-tennis player
Joseph Baggaley, an English trade unionist, based in Canada
Nathan Baggaley, an Australian canoer